Paramiana smaragdina is a species of moth in the family Noctuidae (the owlet moths). It is found in North America.

The MONA or Hodges number for Paramiana smaragdina is 9803.

References

Further reading

External links

 

Amphipyrinae
Articles created by Qbugbot
Moths described in 1884